Prairie Springs Township is a township in Jackson County, Iowa, United States. As of 2010, the township has a population of 627.

History
Prairie Springs Township was established in 1840.

References

Townships in Jackson County, Iowa
1840 establishments in Iowa Territory
Townships in Iowa
Populated places established in 1840